An Ambition Reduced to Ashes  is a 1995 Cambodian short feature drama film written and directed by Norodom Sihanouk, King of Cambodia. The film was made right after his recovery from cancer in Beijing, China.

Cast
Kong Sophy
Mom Soth
Chorn Torn

References

External links

1995 films
1995 drama films
Cambodian drama films
Khmer-language films
Cambodian short films